Mediator of RNA polymerase II transcription subunit 15, also known as Gal11, Spt13 in yeast and  PCQAP, ARC105, or TIG-1 in humans is a protein encoded by the MED15 gene.

Function 

MED15 is a general transcriptional cofactor of the mediator complex involved in RNA polymerase II dependent transcription, originally called Gal11 and Spt13 and found in yeast as an essential factor for Gal4 dependent transactivation by T.Fukasawa and F.Winston labs. Transcription factors Gcn4, Pho4, Msn2, Ino2, members of the Gal4 family - Gal4, Oaf1, Pdr1, and viral VP16 have been reported to interact with yeast MED15.

Most of these transcription factors share the same transactivation domain, 9aaTAD, which directly interacts with KIX domain of the MED15.

Furthermore, human MED15 cooperates in mediator complex (previously known as PC2, ARC, or DRIP) with transcription factors like VP16 and  SREBP. Human SREBP regulates sterol responsive gene expression, and this regulatory action is conserved in the genetic model organism C. elegans, a roundworm (homologues MDT-15 and SBP-1). Also in C. elegans, MDT-15 is essential for the response to several stresses (fasting, heavy metal, toxin, and oxidative stress); at least in part the fasting response is conferred by interactions of MDT-15 with nuclear receptors, including NHR-49.

Gene 
The MED15 gene contains stretches of trinucleotide repeats and is located in the chromosome 22 region which is deleted in DiGeorge's syndrome. Two transcript variants encoding different isoforms have been found for this gene.

References

Further reading